Albert Sidney Priddy (December 7, 1865 – January 13, 1925) was an American physician and politician. He served two non-consecutive terms as a member of the Virginia House of Delegates from Charlotte County. A proponent of eugenics and compulsory sterilization, Priddy was instrumental in the founding of the Virginia State Colony for Epileptics and Feebleminded and served as its first superintendent. It was in this capacity that he was named as defendant in the case Buck v. Priddy. The case was later renamed Buck v. Bell after his death in 1925 and made it to the Supreme Court of the United States.

References 

1865 births
1925 deaths
Democratic Party members of the Virginia House of Delegates
19th-century American politicians